Raumanga is a suburb of Whangārei in the Northland Region of New Zealand. It is the site of Northland Polytechnic's main campus.

Demographics

Raumanga, comprising the statistical areas of Raumanga and Tarewa, had a population of 5,292 at the 2018 New Zealand census, an increase of 840 people (18.9%) since the 2013 census, and an increase of 549 people (11.6%) since the 2006 census. There were 1,554 households, comprising 2,700 males and 2,592 females, giving a sex ratio of 1.04 males per female, with 1,491 people (28.2%) aged under 15 years, 1,227 (23.2%) aged 15 to 29, 2,085 (39.4%) aged 30 to 64, and 489 (9.2%) aged 65 or older.

Ethnicities were 51.8% European/Pākehā, 60.0% Māori, 6.9% Pacific peoples, 4.9% Asian, and 1.5% other ethnicities. People may identify with more than one ethnicity.

The percentage of people born overseas was 9.8, compared with 27.1% nationally.

Although some people chose not to answer the census's question about religious affiliation, 50.6% had no religion, 31.0% were Christian, 7.6% had Māori religious beliefs, 0.5% were Hindu, 0.3% were Muslim, 0.3% were Buddhist and 2.2% had other religions.

Of those at least 15 years old, 306 (8.1%) people had a bachelor's or higher degree, and 903 (23.8%) people had no formal qualifications. 243 people (6.4%) earned over $70,000 compared to 17.2% nationally. The employment status of those at least 15 was that 1,626 (42.8%) people were employed full-time, 462 (12.2%) were part-time, and 399 (10.5%) were unemployed.

Education
The school was formed in 2002 with the merger of Raumanga Primary and Middle Schools.

Notes

External links
 Manaia View School website

Suburbs of Whangārei